The Holy Lazarica Monastery also known as the Dalmatinska Lazarica, is a Serbian Orthodox monastery located in Zvjerinac, near Knin, Croatia. It was finished in 1889, its construction having started in 1874. It is dedicated to Prince Lazar of Serbia.

External links

Knin
Serbian Orthodox monasteries in Croatia
19th-century Serbian Orthodox church buildings
Buildings and structures in Šibenik-Knin County